Ketou may refer to:
 Kétou, Benin, Yoruba town, arrondissement, and commune located in the Plateau Department of the Republic of Benin
 Ketu (Benin), historical region of what is now the Republic of Benin
 Ketou Township, a township of Xinhua County, Hunan, China
 "Ketou" or kowtow,  the Chinese act of respect shown by kneeling and bowing